Zion Hill may refer to:
Zion Hill, Guadalupe County, Texas
Zion Hill, Jasper County, Texas
Zion Hill, Trinity County, Texas, another name for Thompson
Zion Hill, Upshur County, Texas